Uncial 0307 (in the Gregory-Aland numbering), is a Greek uncial manuscript of the New Testament. Paleographically it has been assigned to the 7th century.

The codex contains a small texts of the Gospels, on 7 parchment leaves (28 by 22 cm). 
It contains Matthew 11:21-12:4; Mark 11:29-12:21; Luke 9:39-10:5; 22:18-47.

Written in two columns per page, 22 lines per page, in uncial letters. It is a palimpsest. 

It is currently housed at the Vatican Library (Vat. gr. 2061) in Rome.

See also 

 List of New Testament uncials
 Biblical manuscripts
 Textual criticism

References

External links 

 "Continuation of the Manuscript List", Institute for New Testament Textual Research, University of Münster. Retrieved April 9, 2008

Greek New Testament uncials
Palimpsests
9th-century biblical manuscripts
Manuscripts of the Vatican Library